Knut Russell (23 June 1902 – 10 December 1961) was a Swedish sprinter. He competed in the men's 100 metres event at the 1924 Summer Olympics.

References

External links
 

1902 births
1961 deaths
Athletes (track and field) at the 1924 Summer Olympics
Swedish male sprinters
Olympic athletes of Sweden
Sportspeople from Norrköping
20th-century Swedish people